McCorkle-Fewell-Long House is a historic home located at Rock Hill, South Carolina.  It was built prior to 1821, and extensively rebuilt about 1880, incorporating Queen Anne style elements. It is a two-story, five bay dwelling of heavy timber-frame construction sheathed with weatherboard and flushboard siding. It features a full-width front porch with square columns and decorative scrollwork.  Located to the rear of the house is the former carriage house (c. 1900).

It was listed on the National Register of Historic Places in 1980.

References

Houses on the National Register of Historic Places in South Carolina
Queen Anne architecture in South Carolina
Houses completed in 1880
Buildings and structures in Rock Hill, South Carolina
National Register of Historic Places in Rock Hill, South Carolina
Houses in York County, South Carolina